Live in St. Petersburg is a live album by American post-punk band Tuxedomoon, released in 2002 by Neo Acustica.

Track listing

Personnel 
Adapted from the Live in St. Petersburg liner notes.

Tuxedomoon
 Steven Brown – saxophone, keyboards, piano, vocals
 Peter Dachert (as Peter Principle) – bass guitar, guitar, loops, tape, drum programming
 Blaine L. Reininger – violin, guitar, keyboards, vocals

Production and additional personnel
 Igor Bystrov – mixing
 Alexander Dokshin – engineering
 Anton Chernyavsky – photography
 Oleg Kotelnikov – photography
 Oleg Kuptsov – executive producer, assistant mixing, cover art
 Gleb Palamodov – assistant mixing
 Michael Rappoport – recording
 Tuxedomoon – arrangement

Release history

References

External links 
 Live in St. Petersburg at Discogs (list of releases)

2002 live albums
Tuxedomoon albums